George Leonidas Leslie (1842–1878) was an architect turned bank robber.

Early life and education 
George Leslie was born in 1842, two years after his parents arrived in America from England. Early into his childhood, his father moved the family from their home of New York City to Cincinnati, Ohio. Leslie's father started his own brewery there, and the business made their family wealthy. Following the move to Cincinnati, Leslie began his education towards becoming an architect in local schools. While in school, he came of age to be drafted into the Civil War, and Leslie's father paid $300 so he did not have to go. Despite their family's high social standing, he was criticized for not going to war and upholding his community's expectations. Putting the criticism behind him, Leslie went on to get a degree in architecture, and graduated at the top of his class at the University of Cincinnati. After graduating, he ran his own architectural firm in Cincinnati. Both of his parents died in 1867, which made him sell the family home, brewery, and his architectural firm, then he headed east to New York City. When Leslie arrived in New York City, he was met by the repercussions of the Civil War. The city was overcrowded, and the rate of crime was high. The corrupted politicians and police left the city to the many gangs that occupied it. Not long after his arrival, Leslie fell into the criminal lifestyle of the gangs. Due to his architectural skills, he quickly went to the top of the ranks in the criminal world.

Personal life 
About 1870, Leslie made Philadelphia his headquarters, and stayed at a boarding house ran by Mary E. Coath. There he met her fifteen-year-old daughter, Mary Henrietta "Molly" Coath. Leslie married Molly Coath after a short courtship. Following their wedding, they moved to New York, where they lived a life of a society couple. Throughout some of their marriage, his wife was clueless about his criminal activity. When she did find out, Mrs. Leslie liked the money that he was making. She was fine with his criminal life, until she found out that Leslie was spending large amounts of time and money on different women. This eventually led to problems in his marriage and later in his gang. On May 10, 1878, Leslie met with his wife and told her that he was in discredit with his associates, mentioned an assassination that may occur, and gave her money. Weeks later, he disappeared, and his wife never saw him again.

Criminal activity 
Leslie formed his own gang of skilled bank robbers early in his criminal career. The more important associates in the Leslie Gang were Tom "Shang" Draper, Jimmy Hope, "Banjo" Pete Emerson, Jimmy Brady, Abe Coakley, John "Red" Leary, "Worchester" Sam Parris. Leslie was the mastermind of the gang, and it was his job to research and plan the robberies. His associates would follow his instructions to carry out the job. His gang robbed many banks throughout the years. From the time Leslie arrived in the east to 1878, it was estimated that Leslie and his gang were responsible for eighty percent of the bank robberies in America.

Most of the banks were not big scores; like the Wellsboro Bank of Philadelphia, Saratoga County Bank of Waterford, New York, South Kensington National Bank of Philadelphia, and the Third National Bank of Baltimore. Those were only a few of the many banks that he and his gang robbed. One of the biggest bank heists that they completed was the robbery of the Ocean National Bank in 1869. They got away with about $768,879, but left approximately two million dollars on the floor of the bank.

The most famous robbery that they pulled off  was the Manhattan Savings Institution robbery of October 1878. It took Leslie three years to plan the robbery, but he did not get the chance to witness his gang's success. At the end of planning the robbery in May 1878, Leslie vanished. Despite his disappearance, Leslie's gang carried on with the robbery. With the direction given to them earlier by Leslie, they got away with about 2.5 million dollars. Even though that was most money that they had ever stolen, Leslie's gang ran into unexpected problems. Not all of the money was cash: $250,000 of it was negotiable bonds, $12,000 of it was cash, and the rest were registered bonds.

Leslie's gang slowly fell apart due to issues with dividing up the money they stole. Not long after the Manhattan Savings institution robbery, the police arrested most of his gang, and brought them in on robbery charges. It was believed that they pocketed over seven million dollars in all, and Leslie himself was never caught.

Becoming the "King of Bank Robbers" 
Before every robbery, he would obtain, if possible, the building's blueprints. His architectural background allowed him to build scale models of his intended targets.  Sometimes he would rent a safe-deposit box or open an account at a particular bank, which gave him an excuse to spend time in the building and observe its layout and operation. Other times he would get one of his men hired as a watchman or porter and ask them to obtain this information for him. When he was certain that the robbery could be committed without him getting caught, Leslie would select his accomplices and explain to them how to execute the robbery. Sometimes he would set up a room to resemble the inside of the target so that his men could practice the robbery while Leslie watched. He also had connections with a few crooked cops and politicians, so it was less likely that he would be arrested.

Leslie had models of many vaults and safes used in the United States. Before he committed a robbery, Leslie would find out what type of vault or safe his target used. Then, he would spend months figuring out how to open it without the combination. Leslie used a device called the "little joker," a wire device inserted into a bank safe's lock in advance to facilitate the robbery. Over time and extended use, the lock's tumblers left dents or marks on the wire that recorded the numbers that made up the combination. Use of this tool required George to enter the bank at least twice prior to executing a robbery, once to place the device and a second time to retrieve it.  Using his architectural skills and the "little joker" helped him elude the police, and he was dubbed "The King of Bank Robbers".

Later life and death 
Later in life, Leslie and his associates were having problems. The gang believed that he was not focused on his job, and that he was spending too much time being a consultant for other gangs. For a price, he would travel to wherever the robbery was to take place and plan the operation for other gangs. He was making decent money off these side jobs without his gang, which caused turmoil between them. There were also rumors that he was being unfaithful with many women, and those women included his associate Tom Draper's wife.

After Leslie's disappearance in May 1878, his body was found lying in a bush at Tramp's Rock in Yonkers, New York, on June 4, 1878. There was a silver mounted revolver and a hat lying beside his hand when his body was found. There were bullet holes in the back of his head: one by each ear, and one under the right side of his nose. The police knew that he was not murdered there because they found no blood at the scene. On June 7, 1878, The New York Times identified the body as a man named George Howard (one of Leslie's many aliases). Leslie's murder was never solved, although there is speculation it was related to Leslie's romantic involvement with the wife of Tom Draper. Many believe that Tom Draper pulled the trigger. Leslie was buried at Cypress Hills Cemetery in New York on June 10, 1878.

See also 
Fredericka Mandelbaum
List of unsolved murders

References

Sources 

Asbury, Herbert. Gangs of New York. Published in 1927.

Pinkerton, Allan. Professional thieves and the detective: with a sketch by the author how he became a detective etc. Repr. of the 1881 version.

1878 deaths
1842 births
American architects
American bank robbers
American robbers
Fugitives
Male murder victims
Unsolved murders in the United States